Symphonie Pastorale is a 1958 Australian TV broadcast of the play by Andre Gide.

Plot
The relationship between a pastor and his wife is affected when he brings home a blind girl Claire. He falls in love with her as does his son John. An operation restores Claire's sight.

Cast
Wynn Roberts as Pastor Etieene
Maree Tomasetti as the wife
Beryl Marshall as Claire
John Kirkbride as John

Production
The play had been filmed with Michele Morgan.

It was recorded in Melbourne at Coppin Hall on and shown to Sydney viewers on 10 April 1958. It was produced by William Eldrige and written by George F. Kerr.

Beryl Marshall was the only member of the cast with TV experience.

See also
List of live television plays broadcast on Australian Broadcasting Corporation (1950s)

References

External links

Australian television plays
1958 television plays
Australian Broadcasting Corporation original programming
English-language television shows
Australian live television shows
Black-and-white Australian television shows